Jacotia is a genus of thrips in the family Phlaeothripidae.

Species
 Jacotia elegiae
 Jacotia glyptus
 Jacotia idaeus
 Jacotia palmerae
 Jacotia rhodorcha

References

Phlaeothripidae
Thrips genera